Friday Night Lights is the third official mixtape from Fayetteville, North Carolina rapper J. Cole. It was released on November 12, 2010. The mixtape was to originally be called Villematic and contain J. Cole's previous leaks and freestyles, however, Cole later stated it would have original material. The mixtape became the second most searched and trending topics on Google and Twitter respectively following its release. Most songs on the mixtape were slated to be on his debut album at one point or another. The mixtape has been viewed over 4,470,000 times, streamed over 1,280,000 times, and downloaded over 1,700,000 times on mixtape site DatPiff.  On June 26, 2013, Cole announced that he would be re-releasing The Warm Up and Friday Night Lights for retail sale, in order to "give them the push they deserved".

Background
The original tracks on the mixtape were intended to be on Cole's debut album Cole World: The Sideline Story. However, because the label did not believe it would sell, Cole released the original songs with extra freestyles as a mixtape, but was forced to redo the entire album.  "In The Morning" featuring Drake, was the only record from the mixtape to make the album cut.

Production

Producers who contributed to the tape are J. Cole himself, Bink, Kanye West, L&X Music, Syience, & long-time friends Elite and Omen.

Track information
The bonus track on the mixtape, "Looking For Trouble" was released for free on November 7, 2010 by Kanye West as part of his series G.O.O.D. Fridays where he released a song every Friday for multiple months until Christmas of 2010. In an interview with Complex magazine in November 2010 Cole talked about how the song came about saying:

A video for "In the Morning" was shot during a concert in Paris. J. Cole and Drake performed the song live on many occasions, such as Drake's Lights Dreams and Nightmares Tour. Cole said “It was my first time in Paris, and I got a text from Drake. And it was him just telling me he heard "In the Morning" for the first time. My real fans will know that it's an older song,” Cole tells Vibe. “He said it was incredible, and I’ve always wanted to bring that record back to life because the original version I recorded in my bedroom—in my old crib, in my small room.” Feeling the time was right for two of rap's most talked about rookies to team up, Cole calmly told Drake that he wanted to revamp the record.

Critical response

Friday Night Lights received widespread acclaim from critics. AllHipHop gave the mixtape a rare classic rating of 10/10 saying, "Friday Night Lights is a mixtape with very few blemishes and faults.  Cole nicely knits together a very interesting precursor to his upcoming album Cole World and it holds its own as one of the most complete mixtapes of the year. Is he “The One”?  Well we do not know that yet – but Friday Night Lights definitely has us paying attention."   In the same vein, Lost In The Sound gave the mixtape 88/100 saying, "Friday Night Lights is a great effort from Cole all around, showcasing both his lyrical and production talents, but still addressing all of the emotional issues that have become the ‘bread-and-butter’ of Cole's musical repertoire." Robert Christgau, writing for MSN Music, gave the mixtape a three-star honorable mention, indicating "an enjoyable effort consumers attuned to its overriding aesthetic or individual vision may well treasure." He felt that there are several good songs, but few "irresistible ones", and cited both "Blow Up" and "Farewell" as highlights.

Friday Night Lights won Best Mixtape of the Year at the 2011 BET Hip Hop Awards.

Track listing

Sample credits
"Too Deep for the Intro" samples "Didn't Cha Know" by Erykah Badu.
"Back to the Topic" samples "Must be Love" by Cassie.
"You Got It" samples "Neon Valley Street" by Janelle Monáe, and an interpolation of "Hypnotize" by Notorious B.I.G.
"Villematic" samples "Devil in a New Dress" by Kanye West featuring Rick Ross.
"Enchanted" interpolates "Hail Mary" by 2Pac.
"Blow Up" samples "Hocus Pocus" by Focus
"In the Morning" interpolates "Can I Get A" by Jay-Z
"The Autograph" samples "Julie" by The Class-Set.
"Best Friend" samples "Best Friends" by Missy Elliott featuring Aaliyah.
"Cost Me a Lot" samples "My Man" by Billie Holiday, and an interpolation of "Don't Take It Personal (Just One of Dem Days)" by Monica.
"Premeditated Murder" samples "That Sweet Woman of Mine" by Leon Haywood
"Home for the Holidays" samples "Doc" by Chocolate Milk & interpolates "Wanksta" by 50 Cent and "Holla at Me" by 2Pac
"Love Me Not" samples "My Cherie Amour" by Stevie Wonder.
"See World" samples "Living Inside Your Love" by Earl Klugh, and/ "Pain" by 2Pac.
"Farewell" samples "So Fresh, So Clean" by OutKast.
"Looking For Trouble" samples "Blue Dance Raid" by Steel Pulse, and "Bubble Music" by Cam'ron.

Additional credits
"Home for the Holidays" features additional background vocals by Beyoncé

References

External links
J. Cole Blog
J. Cole - Friday Night Lights Mixtape

2010 mixtape albums
Albums produced by Bink (record producer)
Albums produced by Bryan-Michael Cox
Albums produced by Kanye West
Albums produced by Timbaland
Albums produced by J. Cole
J. Cole albums
Dreamville Records albums